Kang Jin-a (born August 18, 1981) is a South Korean film director and screenwriter.

Early life 
Kang graduated from Hongik University's Department of Visual Design in 2004.

Career
Kang's work mainly deals with the themes of life and death, including Suicide of the Quadruplets (2008), Be with Me (2009) and Paprika Feast (2011). Her short Be with Me (2009) won the Best Film in A Short Film About Love at the 9th Mise-en-scène Short Film Festival in 2010. Her directorial feature debut Dear Dolphin (2013), an exploration of life, love and grief, premiered at the 14th Jeonju International Film Festival and won the CGV Movie Collage Prize. Pierce Conran of Twitch Film praised "Kang's natural ability as both a storyteller and a stylist" but described some elements of the film as derivative, while Derek Elley of Film Business Asia was more critical, stating that it "lacks the wrenching feeling it should have built towards".

Kang's next work after Dear Dolphin, entitled That's Not True, was released in 2015 as part of KT&G Sangsangmadang's "Mag(Magazine) Movie Project: A Woman and A Man", and starred veteran actress Lee Mi-yeon as well as singer Baro.

Filmography

As director/screenwriter 
Suicide of the Quadruplets (short film, 2008) - director
Be with Me (short film, 2009) - director, screenwriter
49th Day (short film, 2011) - director
Nice Shorts! 2011 (segment: "Growing Old Together") (2011) - director, screenwriter
Paprika Feast (구천리 마을잔치; short film, 2011) - director, screenwriter
Dear Dolphin (2013) - director, screenwriter
That’s Not True (그게 아니고; short film, 2015) - director

As editor 
Volcano High (2001) - location editor
The Squadron Vignette (short film, 2003) - assistant director, script editor
Blind Interview (short film, 2004) - editor 
Camellia Project (2005) - assistant editor
Be with Me (short film, 2009) - editor
Nice Shorts! 2011 (segment: "Growing Old Together") (2011) - editor

Trailer 
My Teacher, Mr. Kim (2003)
Save the Green Planet! (2003) 
A Good Lawyer's Wife (2003)
Once Upon a Time in a Battlefield (2003)
Ice Rain (2004)
Au Revoir, UFO (2004)
Spider Forest (2004)

 Visual effect Save the Green Planet! (2003)Ice Rain (2004)Au Revoir, UFO (2004)

 Art direction The Coast Guard'' (2002)

References

External links 
 
 
 

1981 births
Living people
South Korean film directors
South Korean screenwriters
Hongik University alumni